The Sociedade Propagadora dos Conhecimentos Úteis (Society for the Diffusion of Useful Knowledge) of Lisbon, Portugal, formed in 1837. The group produced a weekly illustrated magazine, O Panorama, intended for the general interest reader and priced relatively affordably. According to the society, some copies were also distributed free of charge to charities such as Casa Pia orphanage and Casa de Expostos. Other contributors included Rodrigo Jose de Lima Felner.

The society formed during a post-civil war era of liberalized civil society in Portugal. Organizations with similar educational missions included the Sociedade das Ciências Médicas e da Literatura (est. 1833), Sociedade Promotora da Indústria Nacional (reactivated in 1834), Sociedade dos Amigos das Letras (est. 1836).(pt)

See also
  periodical, 1837-1868

References

Bibliography

External links

 
   (Includes indexes)

1837 establishments in Portugal
Educational organisations based in Portugal
Organisations based in Lisbon
Non-profit organisations based in Portugal
Defunct organisations based in Portugal